This article lists every club's goalscorers in the Asian Super Cup.

Overall top goalscorers

Goalscorers by club

Al-Hilal

Al-Ittihad

Al-Nassr

Al-Shabab

Cheonan Ilhwa Chunma

Júbilo Iwata

Pohang Steelers

Shonan Bellmare

Shimizu S-Pulse

Suwon Samsung Bluewings

Thai Farmers Bank

Yokohama Flügels

See also 

 List of Intercontinental Cup goalscorers

References 

Asian Super Cup
Asian Super Cup goalscorers